Oruj Qeshlaq-e Hajj Omran (also Romanized as Orūj Qeshlāq-e Ḩājj ‘Omrān) is a village in Qeshlaq-e Shomali Rural District, in the Central District of Parsabad County, Ardabil Province, Iran. At the 2006 census, its population was 370, in 73 families.

References 

Towns and villages in Parsabad County